The 2011 Mid-American Conference baseball tournament took place from May 25 through 28.  The top eight regular season finishers of the league's twelve teams, regardless of division, met in the double-elimination tournament held at V.A. Memorial Stadium in Chillicothe, Ohio.   won their third consecutive tournament, and ninth overall, to earn the conference's automatic bid to the 2011 NCAA Division I baseball tournament.

Seeding
The winners of each division claim the top two seeds, with the next six teams, based on conference winning percentage claim the third through eight seeds.  The teams then play a two bracket, double-elimination tournament leading to a final matching the winners of each bracket.

Results

All-Tournament Team
The following players were named to the All-Tournament Team.

Most Valuable Player
David Starn won the Tournament Most Valuable Player award.  Starn was a pitcher for Kent State.

References

Tournament
Mid-American Conference Baseball Tournament
Mid-American Conference baseball tournament
Mid-American Conference baseball tournament